David Bučar (born 8 February 1994) is a Slovenian football midfielder who plays for Brežice 1919.

External links
PrvaLiga profile 

1994 births
Living people
People from Brežice
Slovenian footballers
Association football midfielders
Slovenian PrvaLiga players
NK Krško players